Juan Carlos "Tato" García Padilla (born March 10, 1967) is a Puerto Rican politician and current mayor of Coamo. He is affiliated to the Popular Democratic Party (PPD).

Early life
Juan Carlos García Padilla was born on March 10, 1967, in Coamo, Puerto Rico. He has five brothers. Two of them are Antonio García Padilla (former President of the University of Puerto Rico) and Alejandro García Padilla (Former Governor of Puerto Rico as of January 2,2017)

He obtained an MBA from the Pontifical Catholic University of Puerto Rico.

In 2000, García Padilla was elected as mayor of Coamo.  He was reelected in 2004, 2008, 2012 and 2016, making history to be the longest Elected Mayor of Coamo.

References

External links
 Coamo official website
 

1968 births
Living people
Pontifical Catholic University of Puerto Rico alumni
Popular Democratic Party (Puerto Rico) politicians
Mayors of places in Puerto Rico
People from Coamo, Puerto Rico